This page lists all peerages held by the Lord High Chancellor of Great Britain and Lord Keeper of the Great Seal, whether created or inherited before or after their Lord Chancellorship. Extant titles are in bold.

Peerages created for the Lord High Chancellor of Great Britain

Lord Chancellors never created a Peer

See also
List of Lord Chancellors and Lord Keepers
List of peerages held by prime ministers of the United Kingdom
List of peerages created for speakers of the House of Commons

Notes

External links

Department for Constitutional Affairs' list

Lists of peerages of Britain and Ireland
Lists of British MPs